Prince Abbas Mirza Farman Farmaian Qajar (1890–1935) was an Iranian prince of the Qajar dynasty, the second son of Prince Abdol-Hossein Mirza Farmanfarma of Persia, one of the most preeminent political figures of his time and of the royal Princess Ezzat ed-Dowleh Qajar, the daughter of king Mozaffar-al-Din Shah. He was named after his great-grand father, crown prince Abbas Mirza son of Fath Ali Shah Qajar.

Education
When in 1899, due to the intrigues of the Shah of Iran's entourage, Abdol-Hossein Farmanfarma was exiled to Baghdad in Ottoman Mesopotamia, he sent his three elder sons to Beirut, to the College of Saint Joseph, A school administered by Jesuit fathers. At that time, Firouz was twelve years old, Abbas ten, and Mohammad Vali nine years old.

Abdol-Hossein Farmanfarma had progressive ideas and believed that to lead Persia into the modern world, his children ought to study in European schools and universities as opposed to receiving a classical education. In 1903 Firouz left Beirut for the Lycee Janson de Sailly in Paris. A year later the two young princes still in Lebanon, set out for Europe, accompanied by a French tutor, monsieur Andre Montadon. At a stop in Constantinople, Mohammad Hossein, the fourth son of Farman Farma, and a young cousin, Hossein Gholi, joined them for the journey.

Abbas Mirza, was a sensitive young man who appreciated nature and the human environment. He liked literature, the arts, photography, Italian operas, and history, though ultimately, he was destined for a military and political career. He was also fluent in English, French, and Arabic.

The young prince toured a number of European countries before finally settling down. Abbas Mirza was sent to Harrow School, before training as an officer at the Royal Military College, Sandhurst, England. He also studied at the Universite de Liege. Finally, he spent a year with the French Alpine troops (Chasseurs ALpins), before returning to Persia. On his return he wrote a book in Persian entitled One Year in the French Army (Published 1910) which was dedicated to the young king Ahmad Shah Qajar and his war minister, Azzam.

In 1911, Abbas Mirza married Zahra Soltan Ezzat os-Saltaneh, daughter of Nezam os-Saltaneh. She was a young lady very much interested in the arts and a fluent French speaker. In the same year, Abbas Mirza became a member of the Persian delegation that was sent to London for the coronation of King Geordge the Fifth. While in London, he found a book on the diplomatic relations between Persia and Napoleon which he then translated. The book was published in Tehran with the title The relationship of Napoleon and Iran.

Work
Before the First World War Abbas Mirza, who had been given the honorary title of Salar Lashgar (Army Chief), served as a member of the army General Headquarters in Tehran. He was the commanding officer of two battalions, the Nahavand and the Farahan. He also held the post of governor for the Hamadan province.

During the First World War, he was appointed Secretary of War, as part of the National Government led by his father in law, Nezzam os-Saltaneh. The Provisional Government was allied to the Germans and the Ottomans and fought the Russian invasion of the western areas of Persia. After Germany's defeat, Nezzam os-Saltaneh was exiled to Constantinople with his family, but in the post war turmoil Abbas Mirza returned to Tehran to assist his brother Firouz Mirza (Nosrat ed-Doleh), the Minister of Foreign Affairs, and his father Abdol Hossein Mirza Farmanfarma, the then governor of the Fars province.

After the war, Abbas Mirza was governor of Kermanshah, Hamadan, and Lorestan. For a short period as well he was the Minister of Social Affairs. He was also in the Ministry of War, as part of a comittiee to reform and modernise the Persian military institutions. In the years leading to the fall of the Qajar dynasty, and after its fall, he was twice elected for the Parliament (Majles).

Throughout his life, which involved war, public service, and raising a family (four daughters and two sons), Abbas Mirza maintained an active interest in photography and left a large collection of work behind. He also wrote a history of the war in Mesopotamia (1914–1918), which has been published by Siamak Books, Tehran (1386). He was struck by cancer at the age of forty five and died in Berlin in 1935.

Publications
 One Year in the French Army. 1910
 The relationship of Napoleon and Iran. 1911
 History of the war in Mesopotamia (1914–1918) (Published posthumously by Siamak Books)

Government positions held
 Member of Army General Headquarters (Tehran). C/O of two battalions: The Nahavand and the Farahan.   (Pre World War I)'''
 Secretary of War, 1914–1918
 Governor of the Hamadan, 1915–1916
 Governor of the Kermanshah, 1918–1919
 Governor of the Hamadan province, 1918–1919 
 Governor of the Lorestan province, 1918–1919 
 Minister of War, 1919–1920
 Minister for Justice, 1920
 Minister of Social Affairs, 1920–1921
 Elected Member of 5th Majles, 1925 
 Elected Member of 6th Majles
 Elected Member of 7th Majles, 1930
 Vice-president in the 7th Majles, 1930

Offspring
 Princess Homa Farman-Farmaian (b. 1914–) married Ali Ettehadieh (1901, Tabriz-2000, Paris). She has issue two sons and two daughters: 1) Mansoureh Ettehadieh (b. 1933–) married Dr Nezam Mafi (b. 1924–2009), She has issue, 3 sons and a daughter, Parinaz Eleish, Nader Nezam Mafi, Taghi Nezam Mafi and Sharif Nezam Mafi. 2) Rahim Ettehadieh, he has issue, two sons Mehdi Ettehadieh and Amir Bahman Ettehadieh and a daughter, Haideh Ettehadi'eh. 3) Farhad Ettehadieh. He has issue, two daughters, Maryam Ettehadieh and Leyla Ettehadieh. 4) Shirin Ettehadieh. She has two sons with Dr Hormoz Hojabr : Dr T.-Taher Hojabr Ghelichi and Dr Alexis A. Hojabr Ghelichi.
 Princess Taj-ol-Moluk Farman-Farmaian (b. 1915–d. 4 January 2002). She has issue a son, Mehdi and a daughter, Zahra. Mehdi has two sons. Zahra has two sons, Amir-Reza Amiri and Mozafar Amiri.
 Princess Ezzat-ol-Moluk Farman-Farmaian (b. 1916–) married Mehdi Pirnia son of Mirza Hassan Khan Moshir ed-Dowleh, has issue a son, Parviz Pirnia. Parviz Pirnia has three sons, Hassan-Ali Pirnia, Amir-Hossein Pirnia and Mohammad Pirnia.
 Prince Bahram Farman-Farmaian (b. 1926–) married Bilqeys Alam daughter of Amir Mohammad Ebrahim Alam Shokat-ol-Molk, Governor-General of Fars, and sister of Amir Asadollah Alam (1919–1978) Prime Minister of Iran during 1962–1964. He has issue, two sons and one daughter: 1) Prince Abbas Farman-Farmaian (b. 1957) 2) Prince Reza Farman-Farmaian and 3) Princess Neda Farman-Farmaian.
 Prince Bahman Farman-Farmaian (b. 1934– d. 2012), member of the board International Qajar Studies Association and Kadjar (Qajar) Family Association, regular contributor Qajar Studies, Journal of the International Qajar Studies Association, married Monir Kafa'i. He has issue, a daughter, Princess Sahar Farman-Farmaian.
 Princess Mehri-Dokht Farman-Farmaian, married Asghar Emami (d''. 1999–2016), has issue, three sons, Mir Hossein Emami, Abolghasem Emami and Reza Emami.

See also
 Farmanieh district of Tehran
 History of Iran
 History of Persia
 Persia
 Qajar dynasty

External links
Qajarpages.cog, The Qajar (Kadjar) Pages

Qajar princes
1890 births
1935 deaths
People educated at Harrow School
Graduates of the Royal Military College, Sandhurst
University of Liège alumni
Deputies of Tabriz for National Consultative Assembly
Farmanfarmaian family